Han Tao is a fictional character in Water Margin, one of the Four Great Classical Novels of Chinese literature. Nicknamed "General of Hundred Victories", he ranks 42nd among the 108 Stars of Destiny and sixth among the 72 Earthly Fiends.

Background
A native of Dongjing (東京; present-day Kaifeng, Henan), the imperial capital of the Song Empire, Han Tao is a skilled warrior who serves as a military instructor in Chenzhou (陳州; present-day Huaiyang County, Henan). Nicknamed "General of Hundred Victories" as he is purportedly unbeatable in combat. he fights with a lance made of jujube wood.

Becoming an outlaw
After Liangshan defeated and killed Gao Lian, the governor of Gaotangzhou (高唐州; present-day Gaotang County, Shandong) to rescue Chai Jin, Emperor Huizong appoints the general Huyan Zhuo at the recommendation of Grand Marshal Gao Qiu, who is Gao Lian's cousin, to command an army to stamp out the stronghold. Huyan in turn asks for Han Tao and Peng Qi to be his lieutenants.

In the first clash with Liangshan, Huyan Zhuo and his two assistants run into a marathon fight with a succession of Liangshan warriors. Han Tao engages Qin Ming but apparently could not live up to his nickname. Put on the defensive, Han escapes when Huyan Zhuo comes to take on Qin. In that clash, Peng Qi is captured by Hu Sanniang. Huyan then sends out his cavalry consisting of groups of chain-linked armoured horses, which charge forth in combined ferocity. Overwhelmed, the outlaws hole up in Liangshan with the marsh as buffer as they work out a counter-attack. 

Tang Long recommends that his cousin Xu Ning could beat Huyan's cavalry with his expertise in hooked lance. After being trained by Xu, who is recruited through an elaborate trick, the hooked lancer squad of Liangshan fell the cavalry of Huayan routing his force. Captured, Han Tao surrenders upon the advice of Peng Qi, who has transferred his allegiance to Liangshan.

Campaigns and death
Han Tao is appointed as one of the leaders of the Liangshan cavalry after the Grand Assembly of the 108 Stars of Destiny. He participates in the campaigns against the Liao invaders and rebel forces in Song territory following amnesty from Emperor Huizong for Liangshan.

In the attack on Changzhou in the campaign against Fang La, Han Tao fights the enemy commander Gao Keli. He falls off his steed when Gao hits him in the face with an arrow, thereupon he is killed by the latter's comrade Zhang Jinren, who spears him in his throat.

References
 
 
 
 
 
 
 

72 Earthly Fiends
Fictional characters from Henan